State Road 612 (NM 612) is a  state highway in the US state of New Mexico. NM 612's southern terminus is at the end of state maintenance at the McKinley–Cibola county line, and the northern terminus is at Interstate 40 (I-40) and NM 371 in Thoreau.

Major intersections

See also

References

External links

612
Transportation in McKinley County, New Mexico